Tomichia tristis is a species of very small freshwater or brackish snail with a gill and an operculum, gastropod mollusk or micromollusk in the family Tomichiidae.

Distribution
This species occurs in Eastern Cape Province, South Africa.

Description

References

Truncatelloidea
Gastropods described in 1889